The Rise of Catherine the Great (also titled Catherine the Great) is a 1934 British historical film about the rise to power of Catherine the Great. It was directed by Paul Czinner, and stars Elisabeth Bergner as Catherine, Douglas Fairbanks, Jr., as Grand Duke Peter, Dorothy Hale as Countess Olga, and Flora Robson as Empress Elizabeth.

The movie was banned in Germany. On 14 March 1934 this matter invoked a question in the British Parliament (House of Commons): "Is it to be understood that no British film in which there is a Jewish actor or actress will be permitted to be shown in Germany in future?".<ref name="hansard">[https://hansard.parliament.uk/Commons/1934-03-14/debates/23c00f26-e449-40fe-ae53-42ea3d907f4c/Germany(BritishFilm) retrieved April 26, 2020]</ref>

Plot
This historical drama recounts the events that led to the accession of Catherine the Great, Empress of all the Russias. The film opens with the arrival in 1744 of Princess Sophie Auguste Frederika – whose name would be changed to ‘Catherine’ – from her father's court of Anhalt-Zerbst (in modern Germany) to the court of the Empress Elizabeth.  "Little Catherine" is to marry the Grand Duke Peter, nephew and heir presumptive of the unmarried and childless Empress Elizabeth.

Peter already displays signs of mental instability and a sharply misogynist streak.  He rejects Catherine on their wedding night, reacting to something innocently said by his French valet, claiming that she used feminine tricks to win him over. In time, though, Peter accepts her and they have a happy marriage for a while.  Meanwhile, Catherine gains important experience of government from working as principal aide to the empress.

The empress dies and Peter becomes tsar, but his mental illness is starting to get the better of him, along with sheer boredom in the job.  Catherine still loves him despite beginning a very public love affair with one of her best friends – until one night when Peter goes one step too far in publicly humiliating his wife.  She ceases to love him, which enables her to be clear-headed in supporting a planned coup d'état.  The following morning, he is arrested and Catherine is made Empress of All the Russias.

The elevation is marred by Peter's murder that very morning, contrary to Catherine's command. Grigory Orlov explains that everything has a price, and the crown has the highest price of all. The film ends, with Catherine in tears on her throne, while the cheers of the crowds are heard outside.

 Reception Varietys original 1933 review summed up the film as having numerous sequences with outstanding "direction, portrayal and dialog," particularly crediting performances by Fairbanks (whose performance they described as one of the best of his career) and Robson, while noting that Bergner was "altogether believable" as the young Catherine.New York Times reviewer Dave Kehr described the film as "a handsome but conventional melodrama," but inferior to the contemporaneous rival Catherine biopic The Scarlet Empress (1934) by Josef von Sternberg.The Guardian's'' historical films reviewer Alex von Tunzelmann credits the film with both entertainment value (grade: B-) and substantial historical depth and accuracy (grade: B-).

Cast

Douglas Fairbanks, Jr., as Grand Duke Peter
Elisabeth Bergner as Catherine
Flora Robson as Empress Elisabeth
Gerald du Maurier as Lecocq
Irene Vanbrugh as Princess Anhalt-Zerbst
Joan Gardner as Katushienka
Dorothy Hale as Countess Olga
Diana Napier as Countess Vorontzova
Griffith Jones as Grigory Orlov
Gibb McLaughlin as Bestujhev
Clifford Heatherley as Ogarev
Laurence Hanray as Goudovitch
Allan Jeayes as Col. Karnilov

References

External links 
 
 
 
 The Rise of Catherine the Great view film online at YouTube.com

1934 drama films
1934 films
1930s historical films
Films set in Saint Petersburg
Films set in 1744
Films set in the 1750s
Films set in the 1760s
British historical films
British biographical films
British drama films
British black-and-white films
1930s English-language films
British films based on plays
Films directed by Paul Czinner
Films about Catherine the Great
Films scored by Ernst Toch
Films produced by Alexander Korda
Cultural depictions of Peter III of Russia
Films shot at Imperial Studios, Elstree
1930s British films